The Albert C. Wagner Youth Correctional Facility is a detention facility, located on Ward Avenue in Chesterfield Township, New Jersey, United States. It is named for state corrections official Albert C. Wagner.

History
First opened in 1934, the mixed-security facility is owned and operated by the New Jersey Department of Corrections.  The facility houses violent young offenders, as well as those incarcerated on narcotics charges. As of August 7, 2009, the prison had an inmate population of 1,235.

The facility emphasizes vocational, academic and social programs as well as individual and group therapy, substance abuse treatment and psychiatric treatment.  The Bureau of State Industries operates a metal fabrication shop at the facility.

References

External links

Official website

Buildings and structures in Burlington County, New Jersey
Prisons in New Jersey
Chesterfield Township, New Jersey
1934 establishments in New Jersey